Cəmilli or Cemilli or Dzhamily or Dzhamilli or Dzhamillu may refer to:
Cəmilli, Kalbajar, Azerbaijan
Cəmilli, Khojali, Azerbaijan
Cəmilli, Tartar, Azerbaijan
 Cemilli, Mersin, Turkey